En ménage (English: Married Life) is a novel by the French writer Joris-Karl Huysmans, first published in February 1881 by Charpentier. 

It tells the story of André Jayant, a novelist who marries a petty-minded woman called Berthe. When he finds out Berthe has been unfaithful, he leaves her to live first with a high-class prostitute called Blanche then with a working-class woman, Jeanne, with whom he had had a love affair five years before. When Jeanne is forced to leave for a job in London, André decides he cannot cope with life on his own and returns to his wife. The novel also features the artist Cyprien Tibaille, André's best friend, who had already appeared in Huysmans' previous novel, Les Soeurs Vatard. En ménage is partly autobiographical and both André and Cyprien contain elements of the author's own personality. 

The novel was Huysmans' third and his most ambitious to date. According to Robert Baldick, it differs from its predecessors, Marthe and Les Soeurs Vatard in that "its most impressive feature is its characterization rather than description. This shift from pictorial to psychological interest is illustrated by the number of perceptive character studies - notably those of Berthe Jayant, her uncle M.Désableau, and the maidservant Mélanie - which are to be found in the novel. It becomes even more obvious when one considers the two friends André Jayant and Cyprien Tibaille [...]" (Baldick pp. 91–92). The novel was heavily criticised on its first appearance for its deep-seated pessimism about life. In this - as in many other features - it reflects the influence of one of Huysmans' favourite contemporary novels, Flaubert's L'Éducation sentimentale.

Sources
 Huysmans Romans Volume One (Bouquins, Robert Laffont, 2005)
 Robert Baldick: The Life of J.-K. Huysmans (originally published by Oxford University Press, 1955; revised by Brendan King, Dedalus Press, 2006)

External links
Full French text

1881 French novels
Novels by Joris-Karl Huysmans